Jean-Marc Gaulin (born March 3, 1962) is a German-born Canadian former professional ice hockey player who played 26 games in the National Hockey League with the Quebec Nordiques between 1983 and 1986. The rest of his career, which lasted from 1982 to 1996, was spent in the minor leagues and then in France. He was born in Balve, West Germany, but grew up in Trois-Rivières, Quebec.

Career statistics

Regular season and playoffs

International

External links

1962 births
Living people
Canadian expatriate ice hockey players in France
Canadian ice hockey right wingers
Diables Rouges de Briançon players
Français Volants players
Fredericton Express players
Hull Olympiques players
Ice hockey people from Quebec
Lausanne HC players
LHC Les Lions players
Mont-Blanc HC players
Muskegon Lumberjacks players
People from Märkischer Kreis
Sportspeople from Arnsberg (region)
Quebec Nordiques draft picks
Quebec Nordiques players
Sherbrooke Castors players
Sorel Éperviers players
Sportspeople from Trois-Rivières